Šarengrad is a village in eastern Croatia. It is located along the Danube river and is administratively part of Croatian easternmost town of Ilok. Šarengrad is known for its landscape which is dominated by the river and picturesque houses and church tower next to it. Island of Šarengrad is an 9 km2 river island situated close to the village.

Geography

The village is located in the Syrmia region, on the Fruška Gora slopes, next to the Danube river.

Demographics

According to the 2011 census, Šarengrad had 528 inhabitants.

1991 census

1910 census

Gallery

See also
 Island of Šarengrad
 Church of the Transfiguration of the Lord, Šarengrad

References

External links

Populated places on the Danube
Populated places in Syrmia
Populated places in Vukovar-Syrmia County
Ilok